Prestonia peregrina is a species of plant in the family Apocynaceae. It is endemic to Ecuador.  Its natural habitats are subtropical or tropical dry forests and subtropical or tropical moist montane forests. It is threatened by habitat loss.

References

Flora of Ecuador
peregrina
Endangered plants
Taxonomy articles created by Polbot
Plants described in 1936